"God's S.T.A.R." (pronounced "god's star") is an insert song featured in the 2016 anime series Uta no Prince-sama: Maji Love Legend Star, the fourth season of the Uta no Prince-sama anime series. The song is performed by Quartet Night, a fictional Japanese idol boy band consisting of the characters Ranmaru Kurosaki (voiced by Tatsuhisa Suzuki), Ai Mikaze (voiced by Shouta Aoi), Reiji Kotobuki (voiced by Showtaro Morikubo), and Camus (voiced by Tomoaki Maeno). The song was released on December 21, 2016.

Reception

The single ranked #1 on the Oricon Weekly Singles Chart, selling over 108,000 physical copies within the first week of sales. "God's S.T.A.R." was ranked #2 on Billboard Japan Hot 100, selling 11,477 copies within the first week of sales. "God's S.T.A.R." was also ranked #1 on Billboard Japan Hot Animation. The single was certified gold by the Recording Industry Association of Japan.

Track listing

Charts

References

2016 singles
2016 songs
Anime songs
Japanese-language songs
King Records (Japan) singles
Oricon Weekly number-one singles